Garrett MacKeen (born March 23, 1994 in Burnaby) is a Canadian ice dancer. With former partner Mackenzie Bent, he is the 2014 Canadian junior champion and finished 5th at two World Junior Championships.

Career 
Bent/MacKeen won the novice bronze medal at the Canadian Championships in January 2011. Making their ISU Junior Grand Prix (JGP) debut, they took the bronze medal in Braşov, Romania in September of the same year. They placed 5th at their second JGP assignment, in Tallinn, Estonia, and fourth on the junior level at the 2012 Canadian Championships.

Bent/MacKeen returned to the JGP series in 2012–13, winning a bronze medal in Linz, Austria and placing fourth in Zagreb, Croatia. Junior silver medalists at the 2013 Canadian Championships, they were named in Canada's team to the 2013 World Junior Championships in Milan, Italy. Ranked 4th in the short dance and 7th in the free dance, they finished 5th overall in their debut at the competition.

Competing in the 2013–14 JGP series, Bent/MacKeen won gold in Riga, Latvia and finished 6th in Košice, Slovakia. After winning the junior title at the 2014 Canadian Championships, they were assigned to the 2014 World Junior Championships in Sofia, Bulgaria; they placed 9th in the short, 12th in the free, and 12th overall.

During the 2014–15 JGP season, Bent/MacKeen won gold in Ostrava, Czech Republic and silver in Tallinn, Estonia. Their results qualified them for the 2014–15 JGP Final in Barcelona, where they placed fourth. Having already won the junior title, they were required to compete on the senior level at the 2015 Canadian Championships. They finished 6th and were sent again to Tallinn to compete at their third Junior Worlds. They came in 5th after ranking second in the short and 8th in the free. They parted ways at the end of the season.

In 2015, Garrett left the competitive skating and became a dance partner for skating clubs in the Kingston and Toronto areas.

Programs 
(with Bent)

Competitive highlights 
JGP: Junior Grand Prix

With Bent

References

External links 

 

1994 births
Canadian male ice dancers
Living people
Sportspeople from Burnaby
21st-century Canadian people